The Fairmile D motor torpedo boat was a type of British motor torpedo boat (MTB) and motor gunboat (MGB) designed by Bill Holt and conceived by Fairmile Marine for the Royal Navy. Nicknamed "Dog Boats", they were designed to combat the known advantages of the German E-boats over previous British coastal craft designs. They were bigger than earlier MTB or motor gunboat (MGB) designs (which were typically around 70 feet) but slower, at 30 knots compared to 40 knots.

History
Unlike the Fairmile B designs, the Dog Boats were only produced in component form in Britain. Some were built for the RAF's Marine Branch for use in the long range air-sea rescue for downed airmen. 229 boats were built between 1942 and 1945.

Many versions were produced or converted from existing boats; MGB, MTB, MA/SB, LRRC and post-war FPB.

Since the Fairmile D could be fitted out with a mix of armament that gave it the capabilities of both a motor gunboat and a motor torpedo boat, the MGB designation was dropped.

Two captured boats were put in Kriegsmarine service.

Today the D-type is a popular choice among boat modelers.

There are no known survivors, other than two abandoned wrecks, one in Chatham, England and the other in Ellingsøy, Norway.

See also
Fairmile A motor launch
Fairmile B motor launch
Fairmile C motor gun boat
Fairmile H landing craft
Steam gun boat
Coastal Forces of the Royal Navy

Notes

References
 Lambert, John. Fairmile D Motor Torpedo Boat.  (Anatomy of the Ship series) 1985 
 Lambert, John and Ross, Al. Allied Coastal Forces of World War Two, Volume I : Fairmile designs and US Submarine Chasers. 1990. 
 Konstam, Angus. British Motor Torpedo Boat 1939–45. (New Vanguard). Osprey 2003. 
 Konstam, Angus. British Motor Gun Boat 1939-45 (New Vanguard) Osprey 2010 978-1849080774
 Chesneau, Roger (editor).Conway's All the World's Fighting Ships 1922–1946. London, UK: Comway Maritime Press, 1980. 
 Reynolds, Leonard C. Motor Gunboat 658: The Small Boat War in the Mediterranean 1955/2002.

External links

 Coastal Forces And Communications with France Before D Day 1944
List of Motor Torpedo Boats at unithistories.com

Military boats
Ships of the Royal Navy
Motor torpedo boats of the Royal Navy
Patrol boat classes
Auxiliary search and rescue ship classes
Gunboat classes
Torpedo boat classes